Haemabasis is a genus of moths of the family Erebidae. The genus was erected by George Hampson in 1913.

Species
Haemabasis calodesma Rothschild, 1905
Haemabasis continua Walker, 1862
Haemabasis pulchrifascia Hulstaert, 1924

References

Catocalinae